The Cunningham Piano Company  (founded 1891 by Patrick J. Cunningham) manufactures acoustic upright pianos and grand pianos. The founder, Patrick Cunningham, was an Irish migrant who started the company with his woodworking and craftsmanship. Within their first decade of manufacturing, Cunningham Piano Company had gained recognition and had become a popular piano making company in  Philadelphia's Germantown Neighborhood.

During the 1920s, the heyday of the pneumatic player piano, Cunningham Piano Company was the largest manufacturer of player pianos in Philadelphia, and shipped their wares to the entire East Coast of the United States.

Noted musicians use the instruments, including Vincent Persichetti, a native Philadelphian and noted composer and professor at the Juilliard School, and George Gershwin who used a Cunningham Piano to write his opera "Porgy and Bess" in Folly Beach, South Carolina.

The Great Depression was a great blow to the businesses. Before the start of World War II, Cunningham Piano Company ceased production and their staff focused on helping the war effort, which reduced sales and profits.

After World War II 
After the Second World War, Louis Cohen, a young piano technician who had worked for Patrick J. Cunningham, took over and changed the face of Cunningham Piano Company. Cohen determined that building a small number of pianos by hand without the national recognition of companies like Mason & Hamlin, Steinway, or Baldwin was difficult in the economic climate of the post World War II era. He went about gathering talent from those manufacturers and other areas of piano technology to set up a restoration facility. He chose Germantown, Philadelphia as the new location.

References 

Piano manufacturing companies of the United States
Manufacturing companies based in Philadelphia